The Portuguese Episcopal Conference is a collective body of the national church and the administration of the Roman Catholic Church in Portugal. The Portuguese Episcopal Conference performs certain pastoral functions designed to deal with the liturgical, disciplinary and other issues specific to the Catholic community in Portugal. The supreme body of the Episcopal Conference is the Portuguese general assembly of bishops and archbishops. Decisions of the Episcopal Conference are approved by the Pope.

History
The Portuguese Episcopal Conference was formed September 1, 2000.

Structure
Current members of the Episcopal Conference are all Portuguese bishops and archbishops. The governing body of the conference is the Presidency. Between sessions of the conference, which meet twice a year, operates the Permanent Council, composed of a chairman, vice-chairman, secretary and two permanent members.

Presidency

The current members of the Presidium are:

Cardinal Patriarch of Lisbon Manuel Clemente - the president of the Presidium;

Bishop of Leiria-Fatima, Antônio Augusto dos Santos Marto - Vice-President of the Presidium;

Priest Manuel Joaquim Gomes Barbosa

Permanent Council

The current members of the Permanent Council are:

Archbishop of Braga Jorge Ferreira da Costa Ortiga - Chairman of the Permanent Council;

Bishop of Porto, António Francisco dos Santos - Vice-Chairman of the Permanent Council;

Archbishop of Évora, José Francisco Sanches Alves - The Secretary of the Permanent Council;

Bishop of Viana do Castelo Anacleto Cordeiro Gonçalves de Oliveira - a permanent member;

Bishop of Coimbra Virgílio do Nascimento Antunes - a permanent member.

The Conference Board

Standing Committee, acting under the Catholic Bishops' Conference of Portugal:

Commission on the Social and Cultural Affairs;

Commission for Ecumenism;

The Commission on Christian Education;

Commission on the Laity and Family;

Liturgical Commission;

Missionary Committee;

Commission on Refugees and Exiles;

The Board of pastoral care.

See also
Annuario Pontificio, Vatican, 2003
Catholic Church in Portugal

References

External links
 http://www.ecclesia.pt/
 http://www.gcatholic.org/dioceses/conference/087.htm

Portugal
Catholic Church in Portugal